, born , is a Japanese actor and musician.

Career
He originally entered show business as the bassist for the Japanese rock bands, The Tigers and Pyg, but later switched to acting. The veteran of over 115 films, he won the Best Actor Japanese Academy Award for The Sting of Death in 1991, and was nominated for the Best Supporting Actor award in 1994. He appeared in Toshiyuki Morioka's Jokyo Monogatari in 2013.

Selected filmography

Films

Television
 Ashura no Gotoku Part2 (1980)
 Kenpō wa Madaka (1996), Toshio Irie
 AIBOU: Tokyo Detective Duo (2000-2011)
 Boushi (2008)
 Fumō Chitai (2009)
 Doctor X (2012 - 2021)
 Shiroi Kyotō (2019)

References

External links

 

1947 births
Living people
Male actors from Kyoto
Japanese male film actors
Japanese male television actors
Japanese rock bass guitarists
Musicians from Kyoto
20th-century Japanese guitarists
20th-century Japanese male actors
21st-century Japanese guitarists
21st-century Japanese male actors